The National Humane Alliance fountains are a series of granite drinking fountains  distributed by the National Humane Alliance, intended to provide fresh drinking water for horses, dogs, cats, and people. About 125 of the fountains were donated to cities throughout the United States and Mexico between 1902 and 1915. Most of the fountains have been removed from their original sites, usually in the center of busy intersections, but at least 70 of them are still publicly viewable. Two examples are listed on the National Register of Historic Places: one in Des Moines, Iowa (also known as the Southeast Water Trough) and one in Albuquerque, New Mexico.

History
The National Humane Alliance was founded in 1897 by Hermon Lee Ensign, a philanthropist and animal welfare advocate who had amassed a fortune in the advertising business. When he died in 1899, he left much of his wealth to build animal drinking fountains for any city that requested one. The fountains were provided free of charge as long as the city provided an appropriate site, water supply, and maintenance. Between 1904 and 1912, more than 100 cities took advantage of the offer. The fountains were produced in Vinalhaven, Maine by the Bodwell Granite Company, the same company that supplied the stone blocks for the Brooklyn Bridge.

The fountains' original use became obsolete not long after they were installed as motor vehicles replaced horses in urban areas. Mostly located in busy intersections, the fountains became traffic hazards and many of them were removed to parks or other quieter locations. Nevertheless, around 70 of the fountains are still publicly viewable, including several examples that have been restored and are still functional.

Design

The fountains are not all identical, but most share one of two basic designs. The fourth side contains a bronze plaque listing details of the fountain's construction. The fountain is assembled from five pieces of granite weighing  in total.

The second fountain design has a smaller bowl and a round, rather than square, pedestal. These were intended for smaller cities and other locations where the bigger fountain, which could accommodate eight horses at a time, was considered unnecessarily large. Some of the fountains originally had decorative light standards mounted on top; however, few of these have survived.

Locations
More than 100 cities across the United States received the fountains, and at least 70 are still in existence. (A handful were also located in Mexico and Puerto Rico.) Derby, Connecticut has a website dedicated to the fountains that includes an interactive map of the United States with locations and pictures.

See also
 Drinking fountains in the United States

References
 Mayfield Kentucky Harmon Park 

Drinking fountains in the United States
Fountains in Mexico